USS Sanderling is a name the United States Navy has used more than once in naming its vessels:

 , a minesweeper commissioned in 1918, decommissioned 1922.
 , a minesweeper placed in service in 1941, disposed of in 1944.
 USS Sanderling, intended to be minesweeper AM-410, but the contract for her construction was cancelled in 1945.
 , a minesweeper, commissioned 1944, decommissioned 1957.

References 

United States Navy ship names